Ikhrek is a rural locality (a selo) and the administrative centre of Ikhrekskoye Rural Settlement, Rutulsky District, Republic of Dagestan, Russia. The population was 2,050 as of 2010. There are 7 streets.

Geography 
Ikhrek is located 28 km northwest of Rutul (the district's administrative centre) by road. Aran and Nizhny Katrukh are the nearest rural localities.

Nationalities 
Rutul people live there.

References 

Rural localities in Rutulsky District